Ross Croft Taylor (April 26, 1902 – May 3, 1984) was a Canadian ice hockey player who competed in the 1928 Winter Olympics.

In 1928 he was a member of the University of Toronto Grads, the Canadian team which won the gold medal.

External links
profile

1902 births
1984 deaths
Canadian ice hockey players
Ice hockey players at the 1928 Winter Olympics
Medalists at the 1928 Winter Olympics
Olympic gold medalists for Canada
Olympic ice hockey players of Canada
Olympic medalists in ice hockey
Toronto Varsity Blues ice hockey players